The Rimetea is a small river in the Apuseni Mountains, Alba County and Cluj County, western Romania. It is a right tributary of the river Arieș. It flows through the municipalities Rimetea and Iara, and joins the Arieș in the village Buru.

References

 Munții noștri aur poartă - Ardascheia 

Rivers of Romania
Rivers of Cluj County
Rivers of Alba County